Marynino  is a village in the administrative district of Gmina Serock, within Legionowo County, Masovian Voivodeship, in east-central Poland. Marynino is a rural area with only a few roads and many family farms.

References

Marynino